is a former Japanese footballer.

Career
After a long career with Shonan Bellmare, he announced his retirement in December 2018.

Career statistics
Updated to 23 February 2019.

References

External links

Profile at Shonan Bellmare

1985 births
Living people
Waseda University alumni
Association football people from Saitama Prefecture
Japanese footballers
J1 League players
J2 League players
Shonan Bellmare players
Tokushima Vortis players
Association football defenders